Silene mandonii is a species of flowering plant in the family Caryophyllaceae.

The species is native to Argentina, Bolivia, Chile, Ecuador, and Peru.

References 

mandonii
Taxa named by Paul Rohrbach